Strada Stretta was a Maltese television series that aired on Television Malta between 2015 and 2017. The first episode was released on September 28, 2015 and from the start it generated a nostalgic feeling among the Maltese. As the name implies the setting of the series took place in Strada Stretta, a historic street in Valletta, the capital of Malta. The series takes the viewers to the social and historical realities of 1957, with a plot based on the incidents recorded on a diary that was found in 2015 during refurbishing works on a pub in the eponymous street. The actual setting is based on history books, while the story of this series is based on contextual creativity. Statistics show that approximately 112,000 Maltese people watched the series, which is approximately a quarter of the entire population of Malta.

Plot 

Sylvana a young business woman in 2015 is refurbishing an old bar in Strada Stretta, a street in Valletta which was formerly infamous for being the city's red light district. During the renovations, a personal diary that belonged to a woman (Lydia) in 1957, is found. Lydia's diary transports the series' viewers back to 1957 when she takes the decision to leave her gilded cage and controlling mother in search of a better life with her lover, leaving a life of luxury behind her for the freedom she yearns for.

However, when she finds herself stranded and abandoned in Valletta she befriends Lilly, a bubbly young barmaid who works and lives in the street, who hosts her in return of giving her reading and writing lessons. Strait Street is shown in its former glory when prostitution and murder were commonly associated with the street making it infamous with conservative values at the time. We meet many other personalities, real or fictitious who take us back to this cultural and musical mecca.

The series is mainly set in Strada Stretta and Casa Rocca Piccola in Valletta, and other locations in Malta, such as Villa Blye in Paola.

Cast 

Taryn Mamo Cefai as Lydia

Ben Camille as Mario

Jane Marshall as Marie

Daniel Azzopardi as Guido

Deandra Agius as Lilly

Doriana Portelli as Angela

John Grech as Oscar

Pauline Fenech as Polly

Frank Vella as Reno

Stephanie Agius as Stella

Andrei Grech as Alvio

Louise Doneo as Lucia

John Peel as Wigi

Naomi Said as Victoria

Rene Pace as Guzeppi

Rachel Lynn as Carmen

Aiken Buhagiar as Victor

Lawrence Buontempo as Johnny

Loriannd D'Ugo as Violet

Jerry Mallia as Gian Marie

Josef Mizzi as Carmelo

Neville Refalo as Twanny

Simon Tabone as Gianni

Laura Vella as Sylvana

Shelley Spiteri as Julia

Steven Dalli as Nenu Zaghzugh

Carmelo Gauci as Nenu Anzjan

Frederick Testa as Arturo

Joseph Farrugia as Dun Rafel

References 

Maltese television shows
2015 television series debuts